The 2008 Speedway Grand Prix of Slovenia was the first race of the 2008 Speedway Grand Prix season. It took place on April 26 at the Matija Gubec Stadium in Krško, Slovenia.

Slovenian SGP was won by Tomasz Gollob from Poland. It was the 12th SGP win of his career. In the final, Gollob beat Danes Nicki Pedersen and Hans N. Andersen.

Riders 

The Speedway Grand Prix Commission nominated Matej Žagar as Wild Card, and Izak Šantej and Jernej Kolenko both as Track Reserves. The Draw was made on April 15 in FIM Headquarters in Mies, Switzerland. Denis Štojs later replaced the injured Jernej Kolenko.

  (18) Jernej Kolenko →  (18) Denis Štojs

Heat details

Heat after heat 
 (65,18) Holta, Kasprzak, Nicholls, Adams
 (65,86) Dryml, Harris, Jonsson, B.Pedersen
 (66,14) N.Pedersen, Hancock, Lindgren, Gollob
 (66,41) Iversen, Žagar, Crump, Andersen
 (66,53) Žagar, Gollob, Holta, B.Pedersen
 (66,95) Hancock, Iversen, Harris, Kasprzak
 (67,26) Andersen, N.Pedersen, Nicholls, L.Dryml (E4)
 (66,96) Jonsson, Adams, Crump, Lindgren
 (67,64) N.Pedersen, Crump, Harris, Holta
 (68,30) Andersen, B.Pedersen, Lindgren, Kasprzak
 (67,27) Jonsson, Gollob, Nicholls, Iversen
 (67,75) Adams, Dryml, Hancock, Žagar Heavy rain began during the interval, difficult conditions gave the inside gates an advantage.
 (71,61) Dryml, Lindgren, Holta, Iversen
 (72,59) Kasprzak, Žagar, N.Pedersen, Jonsson
 (72,03) Crump, Nicholls, Hancock, B.Pedersen
 (72,38) Gollob, Andersen, Harris, Adams
 (71,17) Jonsson, Andersen, Hancock, Holta
 (71,01) Gollob, Crump, Kasprzak, Dryml (F/X) Race stopped, Dryml excluded after bailing and slamming into the wall late in the race; bad conditions, very wet
 (71,78) Lindgren, Nicholls, Harris, Žagar (F4)
 (71,26) Iversen, B.Pedersen, N.Pedersen, Adams
 Semi-Finals:
 (71,56) N.Pedersen, Jonsson, Dryml, Iversen
 (70,68) Gollob, Andersen, Crump, Hancock
 Final:
 (71,00) Gollob (6), N.Pedersen (4), Andersen (2), Jonsson (T) (0) False start, Jonsson touches tapes and is excluded; race re-started

The intermediate classification

See also 
 Speedway Grand Prix
 List of Speedway Grand Prix riders

References

External links 
 www.SpeedwayWorld.tv

2008 Speedway Grand Prix
2008
2008 in Slovenian sport